Laban L. Coblentz (born July 21, 1961) is a writer, educator, science policy adviser, international civil servant, and entrepreneur. He is an avid proponent of the use of advanced technology for sustainable development. , Coblentz is the Head of Communication of ITER the International nuclear fusion research and engineering megaproject and the largest scientific cooperation in history.

Early life and schooling

Home life
Coblentz was raised in a pacifistic and insular Amish Mennonite community in Hartville, Ohio.  Although the community as a whole was skeptical of higher education and advanced technology, Coblentz has described his father, Alvin S. Coblentz, as a "self-taught researcher, educator, and 'technologist' of sorts: a watch and clock repairman." A biography of Alvin describes his design of a mechanical device that enabled the operation of an automobile accelerator and brake with a single pedal, compensating for his physical disability and allowing him to get a driver's license. Coblentz has also spoken of his father's creation, in the mid-1960s, of a functioning radio in a wrist-watch case, an invention that was never brought to market because of Alvin's lack of familiarity with the US patent process. The family of eight subsisted on the $200 per month Alvin earned from publishing a conservative Mennonite periodical, The Fellowship Messenger.

Yet Coblentz says his stimulating home environment shaped him:

Well before I started school, I was reading, writing, and disassembling and reassembling pocket watches on the kitchen table. The same incessant three questions have driven me ever since, whether the challenge facing me was setting a pocket watch mainspring, controlling the innards of a nuclear submarine, streamlining a bureaucratic policy, unlocking the potential of a research university, promoting a biotechnology business concept, or unravelling the riddle of U.S.-Iran relations: "What makes it tick?" "How can we make it work better?" and "How can we explain the answers to those who need to know?" I became fascinated by the power of curiosity, the power of innovation, and the power of narrative.

Malone University
Despite pressure from his church leaders to be content with a high-school education, Coblentz pushed to attend Malone University, a nearby Quaker college, earning a Bachelor of Arts degree in English and Psychology in 1982. At Malone, Coblentz took up journalism and fiction, becoming the editor of the campus newspaper and the literary magazine. He also dabbled in theater – a creative outlet that had been forbidden during his early years – taking leading roles in four consecutive university productions, and writing and directing his first play, The Playground.

United States Navy
Shortly after leaving Malone, Coblentz took another “forbidden” path, enlisting in the United States Navy, a decision that led to excommunication from his Amish Mennonite congregation. From 1983 to 1985 he studied reactor physics, nuclear propulsion engineering and radiochemistry at the Naval Nuclear Power School in Orlando and a small reactor prototype in Windsor Locks, Connecticut. This was his first exposure to advanced technology, a shift in focus that would impact his subsequent research and career. Coblentz has said that his first acquaintance with a nuclear weapon came via sleeping on one, referring to the makeshift bunks arranged atop the submarine's torpedo racking system where nuclear-capable Tomahawk missiles were stored.

Scholarship: tracing the nexus of scientific reasoning and literary symbolism
While in the Navy, Coblentz began working on a Master of Arts degree in English from San Francisco State University. His research was heavily influenced by his conversations with the inventor and philosopher Arthur M. Young at the Institute for the Study of Consciousness in Berkeley; ideas on gender and ethnicity put forward by Kim F. Hall, with whom Coblentz studied at Georgetown University; and studies of modernist and postmodernist literary criticism with Professor Geoffrey Green at SFSU.
Coblentz's thesis drew on the novels of Thomas Pynchon, Vladimir Nabokov, and the lesser-known Carol DeChellis Hill to explore parallels between the thought systems underlying subatomic physics and the postmodernist use of symbol. “Like the apocalyptic prophets of the death of literature,” Coblentz wrote, “some physicists have operated in hopes of bringing their work to a closure, speaking of a near future when, with the origins of the material universe explained and the last frontier conquered, physics will become a closed discipline.”

Science and symbolism in Renaissance England
Coblentz's research systematically traces the interplay between scientific reasoning and literary movements – particularly the use of symbol, myth, and language – from the mid-16th century to the present.
For the Renaissance philosopher, the perfect language would be that in which knowing the name of a thing equated to knowledge of the thing’s essential nature. This idea, however, did not result in precise writing (in the way that we think of preciseness), but in lavishly connotative language (as if the writer were trying to light up the essence of the idea from all sides). For the modern linear thinker, scientific prose of the time seems convoluted and obscure. Alchemical recipe books, in their description of unfamiliar processes, are nearly impossible to follow.

These frustrations to a modern reader … are partially because the Objectivity Revolution has been so complete: that is, we have forgotten how to think in the way that this language (i.e., this system of signification) demands, and cannot readily tap the power it affords. The benefit of connotative language, in a world of infinite correspondences, is the ability to illuminate one discipline using the words (and concepts) of another …. As the richest literary achievements of the time demonstrate, a single action or speech, by drawing on a universe of pre-established symbolic relationships, can resonate with multiple meanings (i.e., participate in several myths at once).

The causative power attributed to language and symbol was what made its usage in Elizabethan England differ from contemporary practice, according to Coblentz:

While citizens polled in the 1990s may be uneasy about Bill Clinton’s morals, few would articulate a belief that his extramarital activities would directly impact on the nation’s security. Not so in Renaissance England: the force and resonance of symbol demanded that Elizabeth I remain a Virgin Queen, her publicized chastity a virtual guarantee that the island kingdom would remain inviolate, her borders impenetrable to foreign armadas and other unworthy suitors.

Coblentz dissects the intersection of science, symbol, and public policy in this era, characterizing the “science of natural law” as a tool manipulated by the powerful: “The established symbolic order of things … took on the weight of divine utterance. Careful manipulation of symbol along archetypal lines allowed individuals and countries to embody the archetypes they invoked. Symbol, properly configured, reinforced the power of the queen; slightly realigned, it fortified King James I.”

Policy implications: gender, ethnicity, imperialism
To illustrate this assertion, Coblentz examines the symbolism and pseudo-science applied to the archetypal “Other” – particularly to blacks and women – as England entered the 17th century:

In the English Renaissance cosmology of “natural correspondences” and “self-evident truth,” white skin was superior to black just as day follows night; conveniently, the globe was constructed with Europe above and Africa below (and hell, presumably, below that)…. On the scale of gender, the disreputable qualities of changeability, insanity, and hysteria were virtues female in nature. Female disorderliness … was first evidenced by Eve’s illicit fit of munchies with the serpent in Eden …. Reason (and more broadly – as Baconian science expanded the definition – linear thinking, empirical objectivity, emotional passivity) was a province naturally male, and intuition (non-rational thought, “sixth” senses, and emotional involvement) more naturally feminine.

This pseudo-science, taken a step further, provided an illegitimate but forceful “moral and political justification for a rapidly burgeoning imperialist consciousness”:

The self-evident superiority of white skin, a chaste queen, and English manners and virtues made colonization a veritable service to the colonized. All savages want to be civilized (read: Anglicized), just as all women want to be penetrated and subdued by worthy men, just as all metals “would be gold, if they had but time” [quoting Ben Jonson in The Alchemist ].… [T]he inherent superiority of the English white male could be extended (almost sexually) to colonize (impregnate) the surrounding territory.

Modern science and technology: an inherited imbalance
Moving from the historical to the postmodern, Coblentz argues that similar irrational motivations continue to plague contemporary science, scientists, and science policy – irrationality traceable, in part, to an ongoing battle between science and religion or faith.

If God is one with Nature, but above man’s comprehension, then Nature is a mystery, and science will always be imperfect. If God has placed man over Nature, and objective investigation holds the key, then Nature is accessible, and science will eventually figure it out. It is as simple as that.

My argument is not about religious faith. It is about reductionism versus a web of paradoxical sense … [as] modes of approaching knowledge. It is one way to explain the disproportionate Western ascendancy of yang over yin that spawned the Industrial Revolution, that eventually found science outstripping religion as the primary authority ... It is a way of acknowledging the lopsided left-brain development that could devise incredible new inventions with neither the intuitive foresight to anticipate the implications nor the emotional skills to deal with the result.

Here Coblentz quotes Murray Gell-Mann: “It is difficult to imagine that a handful of residents of a small planet circling an insignificant star in a small galaxy have as their aim a complete understanding of the entire universe, a small speck of creation truly believing it is capable of comprehending the whole.”

Yet reductionism assumes precisely that. The mechanistic world-view assumes a causality underlying all natural phenomena. It assumes, further, that both the fundamental particles (to which all things reduce) and the absolute laws governing their relationships to one another are discoverable by objective investigation.

Coblentz argues that the Einstein-Bohr divergence in view on quantum mechanics and the Copenhagen Interpretation was a difference rooted in epistemology, not strictly physics or mathematics, and thus ultimately led to a search for new forms of language and expression.

This epistemological struggle is also, for the individual scientist, a psychological (even a Freudian) battleground – a threat to the scientist’s view of himself. The Einsteinian’s insistent refusal to accept Bohr’s ambiguities is an insistence born of panic – the panic of the dispassionate objectivist (who is neither dispassionate nor objective except by his inherited white male tradition) forced to face a Void (or, if you like, a Womb) he cannot penetrate, forced to accept truth without explanation, a ‘non-material’ ‘non-thing’ ‘non-inhabiting’ ‘non-space’ that nevertheless demands acknowledgement (notice that language necessarily breaks down; there are no words, and therefore no tools of discovery).

The distress that Relativism causes the classical physicist lies in its ambiguity; it does not deny that truth exists, but it does deny that truth can be comprehended (which, for the scientist, amounts to the same thing). The scientist’s white lab-coat is soiled; he is part of the experiment. Just as he was reaching shore (or so he thought), he is tossed back into the primeval soup.

These theories – drawing on Coblentz's divergent early background in communication, psychology, and nuclear physics – became the lens through which he came to view advanced science and technology. They would increasingly shape his career and particularly his public policy contributions in areas ranging from sustainable development and nuclear non-proliferation to higher education, technology transfer, and entrepreneurship.

Career

Nuclear Regulatory Commission
Upon exiting the Navy, Coblentz worked briefly at the Waterford Nuclear Generating Station in southern Louisiana, then became a health physics and engineering safety inspector for the U.S. Nuclear Regulatory Commission, primarily at West Coast nuclear facilities.

Public education on nuclear issues
The incisiveness of Coblentz's speaking and writing style prompted requests for him to develop a specialized communications course for nuclear inspectors, and eventually led to a nationwide overhaul of the nuclear inspection reporting system, which Coblentz headed.  The resulting approach, as delineated in the NRC Inspection Manual Chapter 0610,  has been incorporated into multiple national nuclear regulatory frameworks. Coblentz later reworked the fundamentals of this communications approach into courses on speechwriting and communication in an international context, which he tailored for the Organization for Security and Cooperation in Europe (OSCE) and other international organizations. It was during this time that he developed close professional ties to E. Gail de Planque, the NRC Commissioner and former head of the Department of Energy's Environmental Measurements Laboratory, with whom Coblentz shared a passion for improving the quality of public education on nuclear technology and transparency in nuclear activities.

Streamlining nuclear regulation
During Coblentz's tenure at the NRC, he was central to efforts to reform three additional problematic policy areas: the protection of nuclear whistleblowers,  the consistency of NRC enforcement actions (violations, civil penalties, and shutdown orders), and the formal incorporation of risk analysis into regulatory oversight and, subsequently, into nuclear power plant operation and maintenance.

Risk-informed, performance-based regulation
The latter of these was the most significant for its long-term impact on the nuclear power industry. By this time, Coblentz's work had come to the attention of the new NRC Chairman, Shirley Ann Jackson, appointed by President Clinton in 1995, and he was working as Jackson's speechwriter and external relations adviser. A major challenge confronting the Commission was the counterproductive economic and safety impact of burdensome regulations that had accumulated over decades, coupled with continuing inconsistent safety performance at some nuclear facilities – which inevitably led to additional regulations. Under Jackson's leadership, Coblentz and his colleagues developed a methodology for incorporating risk into regulation, inspection, and enforcement. Jackson would come to call this “risk-informed, performance-based regulation.”

For well over a decade, each nuclear power plant had been required to conduct a comprehensive probabilistic risk assessment (PRA) of their facility, but these assessments had largely remained on the shelf, as no method had been devised of incorporating them formally into nuclear regulation, operation, or maintenance. The “risk-informed, performance-based” approach, while still emphasizing safety performance as the bottom line, provided a system for prioritizing regulatory inspection and enforcement – as well as rulemaking and licensing – in accordance with the relative degree of risk of the associated nuclear systems, structures, components, and activities. The goal was two-fold: to provide a defensible basis for regulatory oversight, and to encourage nuclear power plant operators to focus their greatest attention and resources in areas of greatest safety significance.

The change in approach required three elements: (1) an exhaustive analysis of the scenarios that could give rise to nuclear accidents (already accomplished for most plants via PRA); (2) the integration of risk analysis with public concerns, Congressional mandates, and other factors; (3) the designation of performance limits that, if adhered to, would acceptably protect against the identified risks.

The transition in regulatory oversight was slow to take hold and went through multiple iterations. But the incorporation of PRA made sense – not only to regulators but to their licensees, the nuclear operators – who found it consistent with the best industrial management practices. The longstanding mantra of making safety the highest priority now had a qualitative and quantitative basis. Maintenance scheduling and budgets now had a framework to ensure measurable improvements in safety performance. A “risk-informed, performance-based” system made it possible to improve safety while simultaneously increasing economic competitiveness.

International nuclear programs
Coblentz and an NRC colleague, Janice Dunn Lee, also supported Jackson in the development of the International Nuclear Regulators Association (INRA). Coblentz later became Jackson's adviser on the NRC's international programs, offering bilateral assistance to developing countries in the formulation of legal and regulatory frameworks, the installation of nuclear medical facilities, and safety and security at nuclear power plants. Coblentz worked with the regulators and operators of post-Soviet states to upgrade inspection and enforcement programs and associated communication protocols.

U.S. Senate Committee on Governmental Affairs

The e-Government Initiative
Shortly after Jackson completed her term as NRC Chairman, Coblentz was awarded a fellowship with the American Political Science Association. As part of the fellowship, he was selected by U.S. Senator Joseph Lieberman to work on “The e-Government Initiative” for the Senate Committee on Governmental Affairs, for which Lieberman was the ranking minority member. Coblentz designed and spearheaded the project with Kevin Landy, Lieberman's counsel on the Committee, negotiating with Senate rules officials to gain permission for this first-of-kind approach to use the Internet to engage citizens in online interaction, enabling direct public input in planning the electronic government legislation.  For three months, members of the public were asked to comment on ways in which the federal government could deliver its services more efficiently and effectively via the Internet. Coblentz and Landy solicited many of the ideas directly from industry leaders; many others were suggested independently by individual citizens. The volume of public response was unprecedented.

The E-Government Act of 2002
Coblentz and Landy worked with Lieberman as well as with Senator Fred Thompson (the Committee Chairman) and his colleagues to distil the ideas into a coherent framework. Coblentz then prepared the initial draft legislation. By this time, Lieberman had been recruited by Vice President Al Gore as his running mate in the U.S. Presidential election, and the e-Government initiative was temporarily set aside; however, after the unsuccessful bid for the presidency, Lieberman introduced the legislation.  The result was the E-Government Act of 2002, a transformative mandate for using information technology to improve the accessibility and cost-effectiveness of U.S. government services.

International Atomic Energy Agency
In August 2000, at the recommendation of his friend and mentor, E. Gail de Planque, Coblentz moved to Vienna to become an international civil servant at the International Atomic Energy Agency (IAEA). At the IAEA, he was the speechwriter and communication adviser to Director General Mohamed ElBaradei.  He contributed to pivotal policy decisions, such as: ElBaradei's push to revive the international nuclear fuel bank (envisioned in Eisenhower's original “Atoms for Peace” initiative), as first articulated in an article in The Economist in late 2003; ElBaradei's support for the 2006 U.S.-India deal to revive exchange of nuclear technology, which was heavily criticized by the traditional safeguards establishment but strongly pushed by the Bush administration;  and a series of high-stakes nuclear nonproliferation crises in Iraq, Iran, Libya, and North Korea.

The Age of Deception
Coblentz has frequently drawn attention to the degree to which non-technological factors, ranging from cultural nuance to geopolitics, have contributed to these crises. He collaborated with ElBaradei on The Age of Deception: Nuclear Diplomacy in Treacherous Times, a behind-the-scenes account of these nuclear crises, published by Henry Holt in 2011. The most eye-opening revelations in The Age of Deception, according to Coblentz, highlight “the degree to which political considerations by various governments trumped real avenues for diplomatic solutions.” 
Coblentz has described touring a munitions factory near Baghdad in the lead-up to the Iraq War, during which he observed Iraqi engineers forging 80-millimeter rocket shells. “The operator was using gloves and tongs to handle red-hot metal, but had no safety goggles; he was wearing sandals instead of safety shoes. Throughout the plant, the most sophisticated pieces of equipment, with labels from Siemens and other hi-tech manufacturers, were layered with dust.” The operators admitted that most of the equipment had not worked in years. There was no equipment maintenance program, nor were there spare parts. These engineering deficiencies were characteristic across Iraq. “The inference was clear: it was highly unlikely that Iraq had retained the necessary degree of engineering sophistication to build centrifuge cascades for uranium enrichment.”

Iraq as a turning point for the IAEA
According to Coblentz, the nuclear inspections in Iraq represented a turning point for ElBaradei and the IAEA. On the day that the IAEA was asked by the U.S. to pull its inspectors out of Iraq, in advance of the March 2003 bombing, ElBaradei altered the draft of a speech he was about to deliver to the IAEA Board of Governors, adding a quote from Adlai Stevenson: “There is no evil in the atom; only in men’s souls.” 
I think what that represented for him – having been in Baghdad myself … finding many of the allegations, the points on which the U.S. and the U.K. were making their case to be inaccurate, it seemed very clear to [ElBaradei] that he was building the case for why there was … no imminent threat. And to have that overridden … was a real turning point. His backbone had always been very stiff; but I think this was the occasion on which he basically said, “Never again on my watch.”

The 2005 Nobel Peace Prize
In 2005, the IAEA and its Director-General were awarded the Nobel Peace Prize. Coblentz has described working with ElBaradei on the Nobel speech:
Everything that you have seen and worked for over the past 30 years – how do you compress that into 20 minutes? What is really the message you want to send [to a global audience]? And we came back to the Iraq War because he had begun to think that the two twin themes of the UN, security and development, really were a single theme. … We were sitting in his office and [ElBaradei] said … “What the Iraq War should have taught us is that security and development are inextricably intertwined.” Where you have poverty and abrogation of human rights, you also often have inept governance, you have a circumstance in which people, as they see the inequity, and are not allowed to express their views, the result is a natural situation for fomenting not only humiliation and injustice but anger, and a sense of wanting to redress wrongs. So from that you have violence of multiple sorts: you have civil strife; you have a breeding ground for extremism; and ultimately, if the seeds are sown deeply enough, that is where we are seeing the pursuit of weapons of mass destruction.

Importance of values in a technology context
In the wake of the Nobel award, ElBaradei was asked to speak on a much broader range of non-technological themes such as religion, faith, and tolerance. Coblentz has recounted how, on the eve of a trip to New York in which ElBaradei was to receive the Human Security Award from the Muslim Public Affairs Council and the James Parks Morton Interfaith Award, ElBaradei had asked Coblentz to focus the remarks on values common to all religions.
We had identified passages from the Quran, the Talmud, the New Testament, the Bhagavad-Gita, etcetera, dealing with universal values such as integrity, charity, and faith. And that day we received news of the shooting of Amish schoolchildren in West Nickel Mines, Pennsylvania. Mohamed called me in to express his horror and his sympathy. He asked me how I thought the Amish would respond. The difference we would witness, I told him, was that the Amish would immediately forgive the shooter and demonstrate that forgiveness to the shooter’s family. In that moment, we both realized the importance of highlighting another universal value: forgiveness. I felt as if my Amish Mennonite background was reaching out to me again, this time in the nuclear context of the IAEA.
Speaking about the ongoing tension over Iran's nuclear program, Coblentz has noted the ways in which miscommunication, disrespect, and a lack of cultural understanding have compounded the standoff between Iran and the West. As an IAEA spokesperson, he repeated ElBaradei's mantra that Iran needed to address a “confidence deficit” with the international community. “What we would hope for is that Iran and other parties would be able to engage in a dialogue that would restore trust.”  Coblentz has continued to emphasize the complexity of the dilemma facing ElBaradei and his successor, Yukiya Amano, when dealing with unverified allegations about Iran's nuclear program.

Coblentz has appeared as an IAEA nuclear safety expert in The Nuclear Option, a documentary film focused on the capacity of nuclear power as a source of sustainable, non-greenhouse gas emitting energy.

Rensselaer Polytechnic Institute
While at the IAEA, Coblentz had continued to collaborate with his former boss, Shirley Ann Jackson, on science policy concepts and speeches. During Jackson's tenure as president of the American Association for the Advancement of Science, for example, she had worked with Coblentz on the theme of the “Nexus of Science and Society,” tracing the historical development of science policy and the role of scientists as authoritative sources in society. 
In late 2007, Coblentz left the IAEA to work with Jackson again as Chief of Staff and Associate Vice President of Policy and Planning at Rensselaer Polytechnic Institute (RPI), a research university in upstate New York where Jackson was the university president.

EMPAC
Under Jackson, Coblentz led the launch of RPI's $220 million Experimental Media and Performing Arts Center (EMPAC). Coblentz developed a close professional relationship with Johannes Goebel, the Director of EMPAC, whose unique expertise and body of work at the nexus of science, technology, and the arts was embodied in the EMPAC academic mission as well as in its physical design. With its extraordinary acoustics and capabilities for creating immersive human-scale multisensory environments, EMPAC lays claim to being three buildings in one: a performance venue for time-based arts, an educational facility, and a first-of-kind research laboratory.

Sustainability at RPI
Shortly after Coblentz's arrival at RPI, Jackson asked him to be the primary touch-point for sustainability initiatives on campus. He served as lead advisor for the Student Sustainability Task Force (SSTF), managing the creation of the RPI Sustainability Charrette and creating a coalition of students, faculty, staff, and administrators that launched dozens of green projects at RPI. Within two years, RPI was featured by the Princeton Review as being among the nation's most environmentally responsible universities.

Technology Commercialization and Entrepreneurship
Jackson also asked Coblentz to oversee a trio of RPI operations focused on intellectual property protection and technology transfer: the Rensselaer Incubator, the Office of Technology Commercialization, and the 1250-acre Rensselaer Technology Park. Coblentz created the Innovation and Entrepreneurship Council to bring coherence to university wide tech transfer operations,  and revamped the RPI incubation approach, launching the Emerging Ventures Ecosystem (EVE)  in February 2011. The EVE concept used a “distributed incubation” approach, placing RPI student and faculty start-up businesses in downtown Troy, integrating RPI's academic prowess in engineering and entrepreneurship with a local focus on urban renewal and drawing on the global RPI network of successful alumni entrepreneurs. “Our goal is to facilitate and ‘turbo-charge,’ if you like, every aspect of technology transfer, from idea generation to patenting and licensing to global growth,” Coblentz said. “To do that, we intend to tap the entire range of Rensselaer resources, and to create partnerships that take symbiotic advantage of strengths in the local community, for mutual benefit.”

Departure From RPI
Coblentz left RPI in September 2011 without public explanation, leading to speculation on the reasons for his departure. The Albany Times Union suggested that he had been “forced out for questioning Jackson’s leadership.”

Entrepreneurship: technology to address global challenges
On leaving RPI, Coblentz began working on a number of start-up ventures. Make It Private, LLC, based in Plano, Texas, builds on advances in the control of digital information, using tokenization to protect consumer privacy (including the prescriptive requirements of the EU Data Directive), and to enable data security in the cloud.

In 2012, Coblentz founded the Tech Valley Center of Gravity (CoG), an award-winning New York not-for-profit focused explicitly on the retention and growth of post-university professionals in New York's Capital District. With the support of a local group of inventors and entrepreneurs, Coblentz transformed an abandoned 5000 square-foot off-track betting facility into a MakerSpace, a member-governed "idea factory" outfitted for metalworking, woodworking, 3D printing, optics, biotech, robotics, electronics, welding, and textile work. The CoG welcomed artists, engineers, scientists, and "creators" from any discipline. It has experienced rapid growth in its first two years, acquiring more than 200 members and serving nearly 50 companies, and experiencing substantial support from municipal and State government agencies, private sector donors, academic institutions, and local NGOs.

In June 2013, Coblentz and the Center of Gravity were recognized by New York's Center for Economic Growth (CEG) with their 2013 Technology Innovation Award. Coblentz spoke to the CEG about his motivation for creating the COG:

I didn't want to do another incubator. However, I did have a fixation on serving post-university professionals - and especially technology entrepreneurs, the segment of the economic ecosystem that is most creative, most open to advice and most willing to take risks. The Center of Gravity provides a resource for those young people - and for creators of all ages, anyone with an idea - who do not have access to university equipment or their own manufacturing plant.

In a discussion with the Albany Business Review, Coblentz explained the design of the Center of Gravity's hybrid incubator-makerspace model as an economic development measure intended to counteract the “exodus” of young innovators from the regional economy. “We’re great at attracting them to our universities. We get them addicted to state-of-the-art equipment and laboratories and intellectual discourse. Then we watch them leave the region. It's economic lunacy.”

Coblentz explicitly differentiated the Center of Gravity from a traditional business incubator, referring to the CoG model as "community-based business cultivation." According to Coblentz: "We don't 'incubate' or isolate. We integrate. We want our companies to be tied into Troy's hands-on urban scene, adding vibrancy and can-do creativity as part of the community." CoG members have full access to MakerSpace equipment and expertise. Instead of focusing exclusively on entrepreneurs and commercialization activity, as most incubators would do, hobbyists and "weekend warriors" are also considered a core part of the CoG community. Social activities are part of the CoG's core programming. CoG members also have access to "SPECTRVM": shared business services ranging from sales and marketing to grant writing and CFOs-for-hire, at scaled rates that match a company's budget and stage of growth.

In 2014, based in part on a $550,000 grant from the Empire State Development Corporation, Coblentz and the Center of Gravity launched a $4 million renovation of the Quackenbush, a long-vacant Victorian-era building in the heart of downtown Troy. In January 2015, the Quackenbush was approved for Start-Up New York designation with Hudson Valley Community College. On August 19, 2015, New York Governor Cuomo announced the opening of the new facility, characterizing the Center of Gravity as playing “a vital role in helping the Capital Region’s tech industry flourish.” In less than four years, the Center of Gravity had grown to support a broad range of companies, most focused on high-tech innovation, such as “a 3D printer manufacturer, a team of RPI grads making bacteria-killing light fixtures, and a company designing aquaponics systems for the Caribbean island of Dominica.”  The Quackenbush would provide a new home for many of those companies.

Involvement in Egyptian Revolution
Coblentz continued to work closely with his former boss, Mohamed ElBaradei, during his time at RPI. In addition to collaboration on The Age of Deception, Coblentz assisted ElBaradei on op-eds and articles criticizing the Mubarak regime in Egypt. During the early days of the Egyptian Revolution, Coblentz and other IAEA colleagues of ElBaradei contradicted the notion that ElBaradei had only recently become engaged in Egyptian politics, saying he had never relinquished his focus on human rights deficiencies in his home country. Coblentz noted that ElBaradei had first confronted Mubarak in early 2003, during the lead-up to the Iraq War, as well as on subsequent encounters.

Coblentz has pointed out the role that social media played in convincing ElBaradei that the young people of Egypt were ready for change: “It was really this last 14 months, where someone I knew as not being particularly computer savvy, taught himself to use Facebook and Twitter and YouTube and started to do in virtual space what was forbidden to do by the Mubarak regime, the freedom of assembly by large groups.”

Coblentz says that, as part of this interaction with the youth of Egypt, ElBaradei realized he had something unique to offer: 
There was a Facebook page that had been put out there by really a 20s-30s crowd in Egypt – “ElBaradei for President” – or something of that title…. And he realized that … he had something unique to offer, that he had this international credibility, that he had been accustomed to very high tension situations, that he had had this experience of standing in the gap with pressure from the US or the UK on the one hand, or from Iran or North Korea on the other hand, and managed to chart [an independent route]. This was something the young people found very appealing.”

ITER: harnessing fusion energy 
In September 2015, shortly after the opening of the new Center of Gravity facility, Coblentz took a new position as head of communication at ITER, the full-scale nuclear fusion facility in Saint-Paul-lez-Durance, France. The largest, most complex multinational science and technology project in history, ITER is designed to demonstrate a self-heating or “burning” plasma, paving the way for the first commercial electricity plants powered by fusion.

Fusion, the mass-to-energy conversion created by the high-speed collision of atomic nuclei, is the engine that powers the sun and stars. As Coblentz said to CNN, “What we’re really doing here [at ITER] is trying to build a star on Earth.” The technological approach, known as magnetic confinement fusion, has been demonstrated in hundreds of experimental machines over the past six decades, usually in the form of a tokamak or a stellarator. By constructing and demonstrating a full-scale facility, the ITER Tokamak will, as Coblentz puts it, “make the C.A.S.E. for fusion” as a Clean (carbon-free, minimal waste), Abundant (millions of years of fuel), Safe (inherently safe physics, no possibility of meltdown), and Economic (competitive cost per kilowatt-hour; elimination of the costs of conflict and competition that go with a petroleum-based energy economy) source of energy.

The ITER machine is extraordinarily complex, designed to comprise more than 1 million components. This complexity is compounded further by the intricate funding and in-kind contribution of those components by the seven ITER Members – China, India, Japan, Korea, Russia, the United States, and the European Union – under the 2006 ITER Agreement. The benefit of this arrangement is that the major powers pool their best expertise, share the costs, and receive equal access to the intellectual property and technology spin-offs, much like CERN.  The challenge, on the other hand, is managing such an arrangement. It is perhaps not surprising that the ITER project had encountered management shortcomings, cost overruns and delays. A sharply critical 2013 audit, leaked to Raffi Katchadourian at The New Yorker, called for urgent reform.

Coblentz was hired by the new ITER Director-General, Bernard Bigot, as part of a senior management team brought in to get the project back on track. Comprehensive reform included integration of the ITER Organization with its Domestic Agencies, more effective decision-making and communication, exhaustive reassessment of the construction and assembly schedule and associated costs, finalization of major component design, and creation of a project culture applying the best principles of risk management and systems engineering.

By mid-2016, project critics were becoming cautiously optimistic, noting the rejuvenated pace of ITER construction onsite and component manufacturing worldwide. Additional countries were expressing interest in joining the newly revitalized project, including, notably, Iran – which, as Coblentz noted to the Associated Press, highlights the exclusively peaceful nature of ITER and magnetic confinement fusion. By the end of 2016, ITER reported that all of the 19 major project milestones for 2016 had been met, on schedule and on budget.

Personal 
Coblentz currently resides in Aix-en-Provence, France with his wife and daughter. He has continued to write plays, including Charades and The Oedipus Experiment. Coblentz also has been fictionalized as a resourceful and ornery naval engineer in the historical serial, Letterstime, Ein Geleitzug: an Alternate History of World War I.

References

External links

Science activists
American technology writers
Living people
1961 births
Malone University alumni
San Francisco State University alumni
People from Hartville, Ohio